is a city in Akita Prefecture, Japan. ,  the city had an estimated population of 67,865 in 31,433 households, and a population density of 75 persons per km2.

Geography
Ōdate is located in the mountains of northern Akita Prefecture, with the Ōu Mountains on the east and Aomori Prefecture to the north. The city is a basin surrounded by mountains on all sides. The mountains in the north are lined with 1,000-meter-class peaks, with Mount Tashiro located at the eastern end of the Shirakami Mountains as the main peak. In the south is the Hinai mountain range, with Ryugamori as the main peak. The Yoneshiro River, one of Akita's three major rivers, runs through the center of the city from east to west, followed by the Sai River and Hikikazu River flowing from the south, and the Nagagi River, Iwase River, and Hayaguchi River flowing from the northeast. Part of the city is within the borders of the Towada-Hachimantai National Park. Much of the city area is covered in forest. Due to its inland location, the city is noted for its heavy snowfall in winter.

Neighboring municipalities
Akita Prefecture
Kitaakita
Kazuno
Kosaka
Fujisato
Aomori Prefecture
Hirosaki
Hirakawa
Owani
Nishimeya

Climate
Ōdate has a Humid continental climate (Köppen climate classification Dfa) with large seasonal temperature differences, with warm to hot (and often humid) summers and cold (sometimes severely cold) winters. Precipitation is significant throughout the year, but is heaviest from August to October.

Demographics
Per Japanese census data, the population of Ōdate peaked in the 1960s and has been in decline since then.

History
The area of present-day Ōdate was part of ancient Dewa Province, and numerous Jomon period ruins have been found within city limits. Populated by Emishi tribes, it remained outside of the control of the Yamato court until well into the Heian period. The first mention of "Hinai", the area of central Ōdate is in the Nihon Sandai Jitsuroku in an article on the Gangyo War of 878, in which Hinai is listed as one of the villages under the control of Akita Castle. During the Edo period, the area came under the control of the Satake clan, who ruled the northern third of the province from Kubota Domain, and who maintained a secondary fortification at Ōdate Castle. The castle was destroyed during the Boshin War. .

After the start of the Meiji period, the area became part of Kitaakita District, Akita Prefecture in 1878. The town of  Ōdate was established on April 1, 1889 with the establishment of the modern municipalities system. During the Meiji period, the discovery of "black ore" (sphalerite and galena - a mixture of zinc, lead, gold, silver, and other precious metals), led to the development of numerous mines in the area, including the Hanaoka mine; however, the deposits were depleted by the mid-Shōwa period.

Ōdate was raised to city status on April 1, 1951. On June 20, 2005, the towns of Hinai and Tashiro (both from Kitaakita District) were merged into Ōdate, almost doubling the city's area.

Government
Ōdate has a mayor-council form of government with a directly elected mayor and a unicameral city legislature of 26 members. The city contributes three members to the Akita Prefectural Assembly.  In terms of national politics, the city is part of Akita District 2 of the lower house of the Diet of Japan.

Economy

The economy of Ōdate is based on agriculture, forestry and seasonal tourism.

Education
Akita University of Nursing and Welfare
 Ōdate has 17 public elementary schools and eight public middle schools operated by the city government, and one national junior high school. The city has three public high schools operated by the Akita Prefectural Board of Education. The prefecture also operates one special education school for the handicapped.

Transportation

Airports
Odate-Noshiro Airport

Railway
 East Japan Railway Company - Ōu Main Line
  -  -  -  - 
 East Japan Railway Company - Hanawa Line
  -  -  -  -  -

Highways

Notable people from Ōdate 

Ginko Abukawa-Chiba, gymnast
Yasushi Akashi, United Nations administrator, January 2001 – June 2003
Shoeki Ando, philosopher
Hirohide Ishida, politician
Hiroshi Ishikawa, film director 
Takiji Kobayashi, writer
Fuyukichi Maki, actor
Masahiko Nagasawa, film director
Nobuhiro Omiya, politician
Takuya Sugawara, professional wrestler
Dick Togo, professional wrestler
Bin Uehara, singer
Keizo Yamada, long-distance runner

References

External links

Official Website 

 
Cities in Akita Prefecture
Populated places established in 1951
1951 establishments in Japan